Maciej Mielcarz (born 15 October 1980, in Śrem) is a Polish retired goalkeeper.

Career

He has represented Poland at U-21 level.

References

External links
 

Polish footballers
Lech Poznań players
Amica Wronki players
Korona Kielce players
Górnik Łęczna players
Widzew Łódź players
Raków Częstochowa players
Ekstraklasa players
I liga players
II liga players
Association football goalkeepers
Living people
1980 births
People from Śrem
Sportspeople from Greater Poland Voivodeship